Stygobromus emarginatus, commonly called Greenbrier cave amphipod, is a troglomorphic species of amphipod in family Crangonyctidae. It is native to Maryland and West Virginia in the United States.

References

Freshwater crustaceans of North America
Crustaceans described in 1943
emarginatus
Cave crustaceans